Charmaine Gale-Weavers (born 27 February 1964) is a South African retired athlete who specialised in the high jump. She represented her country at the 1992 Summer Olympics and 1993 World Championships. In addition, she finished second at the 1994 Commonwealth Games and 1994 World Cup. Because of the boycott of the apartheid era South Africa she was only allowed to compete internationally in 1992.

Her personal best in the event is 2.00 metres set in Pretoria in 1985.

Competition record

References

External links

1964 births
Living people
People from Inkosi Langalibalele Local Municipality
South African female high jumpers
Olympic athletes of South Africa
Athletes (track and field) at the 1992 Summer Olympics
Athletes (track and field) at the 1994 Commonwealth Games
World Athletics Championships athletes for South Africa
Commonwealth Games medallists in athletics
Commonwealth Games silver medallists for South Africa
Medallists at the 1994 Commonwealth Games